Erjavec is a surname. Notable people with the surname include:

Karl Erjavec (born 1960), Slovenian lawyer and politician
Mladen Erjavec (born 1970), Croatian professional basketball coach and former player
Nataša Erjavec (born 1968), Slovenian athlete

See also 
 Mali Erjavec, village in Croatia

Slovene-language surnames